Taoyuan City Constituency II includes districts along most of the coast of Taoyuan City. The district was formerly known as Taoyuan County Constituency II (2008-2014) and was created in 2008, when all local constituencies of the Legislative Yuan were reorganized to become single-member districts.

Current district
 Dayuan
 Guanyin
 Xinwu
 Yangmei

Legislators

Election results

 

 
 
 
 
 
 
 
 
 
 

Constituencies in Taoyuan City